The Fire Equipment Manufacturers' Association (FEMA) is a trade body for fire protection providers, based in Cleveland, Ohio.

History
Founded in 1930, the Fire Equipment Manufacturers' Association is an international, non-profit trade association dedicated to manufacturing commercial fire protection equipment to serve as the first line of defense against fire in its early stages. The association centers its efforts around the premise that safety to life is best achieved through the implementation of a "balanced fire protection design" – a concept in which a proactive safety plan does not rely on any single safeguard.

The Fire Equipment Manufacturers' Association works in conjunction with the National Fire Protection Association (NFPA), International Code Council, local, state,  and national officials to advance positive fire and building codes and laws; and with Underwriters Laboratories, Inc. regarding relevant safety standards.

Divisions
The Fire Equipment Manufacturers' Association is organized into three divisions:
 Interior Equipment/Standpipefire hose
 Portable fire extinguisher
 Pre-engineered fire suppression system

Member companies work in smaller product-specific teams, as well as collectively, to impact industry issues and outcomes.

See also
 Life Safety Code
 National Fire Protection Association

References

External links

International trade associations
Fire prevention
Fire protection organizations